Virgilio Rodríguez Beteta  (1885–1967) was a Guatemalan lawyer, historian, diplomat and writer.

Biography
Rodríguez-Beteta was born in Guatemala City on March 10, 1885, son of General Luis Beteta and Luz Rodriguez Laredo, descendant of the discoverer of California, Juan Rodriguez Cabrillo. He graduated as a lawyer at the University of San Carlos of Guatemala.

In his first marriage, with Elisa Macal Asturias, he had two children, writer Virgilio Rodríguez Macal and a daughter, Martha. From his second marriage to Marta Josefina Herrera, he had one child, Roberto Rodríguez-Beteta Herrera, an airplane pilot and music composer (marimba). From his third marriage with Carmen Martínez Arboleda, he had another child, Luz Maria Rodriguez-Martinez Beteta, a journalist, Industrial Psychologist and mountaineer.

Rodríguez-Beteta lived for extended periods in Honduras, Switzerland, Spain, Chile and Colombia, working in senior diplomatic positions representing Guatemala. He died in his hometown at the age of 82 years.

Work
Rodríguez-Beteta was interested in history, politics and the culture of Guatemala. In 1917 he wrote the libretto for the opera Quiché Vinak. Along with Adrian Recinos, he founded the legal journal The Law, and was also one of the founders of the Society of Geography and History, now  the Academy of Geography and History of Guatemala. He directed the Diario de Centro America.

He agreed to represent Guatemala as ambassador to the governments of Honduras, Spain, Chile and Colombia, as well as ambassador to the League of Nations in Geneva, Switzerland. His old age was devoted to historical research and political science and he publishing a series of books on a variety of topics in these disciplines.

Published work 

 Discurso pronunciado el 2 de abril de 1930.

References
This article was initially translated from the Spanish Wikipedia.
Diccionario histórico biográfico de Guatemala (pág. 795). Guatemala: Asociación de Amigos del País, Fundación para la Cultura y el Desarrollo, 2004. .
Dieter Lehnhoff: Creación musical en Guatemala (pág. 247). Guatemala: Universidad Rafael Landívar, Fundación para la Cultura y el Desarrollo, Editorial Galería Guatemala, 2005. .

Guatemalan male writers
20th-century Guatemalan historians
20th-century Guatemalan lawyers
1885 births
1967 deaths
20th-century Guatemalan people
Ambassadors of Guatemala to Honduras
Ambassadors of Guatemala to Spain
Ambassadors of Guatemala to Colombia
Permanent Representatives of Guatemala to the League of Nations
20th-century male writers